Gracias Martin is the eighth studio album by Mexican group Los Caminantes, released in 1987. It is also a tribute album dedicated to keyboardist Martín Ramírez, the younger brother of Agustín, Brígido, and Horacio Ramírez. Martín was killed in a tour bus accident earlier in the year of the album release.

Cover art
On the album cover art, there is a photograph of Martín along with a message below that reads, "Con cariño dedicamos este álbum a tu recuerdo en nuestro corazón." (trans: "Lovingly dedicate this album to your memory in our hearts.").

Track listing

References
[ Billboard page] 

1987 albums
Los Caminantes albums